Dr Peter John Bentley (born 16 May 1972) is a British author and computer scientist based at University College London.

Peter J. Bentley is an Honorary Professor and Teaching Fellow at UCL, a Visiting Professor at Autodesk and a Collaborating Professor at KAIST. He is also a popular science author and consultant. He was a contributing editor for WIRED UK and was the monthly host of the Royal Institution's café scientifique. He currently writes for BBC Science Focus magazine.

Born in Colchester, England, he achieved a BSc in Artificial Intelligence from the University of Essex (supervised by Edward Tsang) and a PhD in Evolutionary Design (supervised by Jonathan Wakefield) at the age of 24. His doctorate thesis was entitled Generic Evolutionary Design of Solid Objects using a Genetic Algorithm and pioneered the use of evolutionary computation for generative design.

Since 1997 has been head of the Digital Biology Interest Group at the Department of Computer Science, University College London. His research focuses on evolutionary computation, artificial life, swarm intelligence, artificial immune systems, artificial neural networks and other types of biologically inspired computing, which he terms Digital Biology. He participates in science festivals and public events, for example he organised and chaired the debate on Complexity and Evolution held as part of the Genetic and Evolutionary Computation Conference at the Natural History Museum in July 2007 with Richard Dawkins, Steve Jones, Lewis Wolpert. His research has been described in several articles of New Scientist. His recent research focuses on morphological computation and novel architectures designed for natural computation based on evolution, developmental and self-assembling systems.

He received extensive publicity for his iPhone application iStethoscope, which was developed in collaboration with cardiologists in USA. The app has been used to gather heart sounds from people around the world in a research project to enable computers to diagnose heart disease automatically using machine learning.

He cofounded the online marketplace Kazoova Ltd which specialises in quirky and unusual activities and was Chief Technology Officer of AI company Braintree Ltd from 2016 to 2019.

His notable PhD students include Siavash Haroun Mahdavi, who founded Within Technologies formerly Complex Matters, acquired by Autodesk in 2014, with generative design subsequently incorporated into several Autodesk products. Bentley became a Visiting Professor at Autodesk Research in 2020.

His books include the critically acclaimed ‘’Digital Biology’’, ‘’Undercover Scientist’’ and ‘’Digitized’’.

Popular books

 10 Short Lessons in Artificial Intelligence and Robotics, 
 Digitized: The science of computers and how it shapes our world, 
 The Undercover Scientist: Investigating the Mishaps of Everyday Life, 
 Why Sh*t Happens: The Science of a Really Bad Day,  (US version of The Undercover Scientist)
 The Invention of Numbers. From Zeroes to Heroes: The secrets of numbers and how they created our world,  (Revised paperback edition of The Book of Numbers)
 The Book of Numbers: The Secret of Numbers and How They Changed the World, 
 Digital Biology. How nature is transforming our technology and our lives,

Academic books

 Evolutionary Design by Computers, 
 Creative Evolutionary Systems, 
 On Growth, Form and Computers, 
 The PhD Application Handbook,

Academic proceedings

 Artificial Immune Systems. Proceedings of the Seventh International Conference (ICARIS 2008), 
 Advances in Artificial Life. Proceedings of the Eighth European Conference (ECAL 2005), 
 Artificial Immune Systems. Proceedings of the Fourth International Conference (ICARIS 2005), 
 Artificial Immune Systems. Proceedings of the Third International Conference (ICARIS 2004), 
 Evolvability, Genetics & Development in Natural and Constructed Systems: Abstracts of the EPSRC Evolvability Network Symposium, August 2003
 Artificial Immune Systems. Proceedings of the Second International Conference (ICARIS 2003), 
 Artificial Immune Systems. Proceedings of the First International Conference (ICARIS), 
 Proceedings of the AISB99 Symposium on Creative Evolutionary Systems, 
 AID 1998 1st Workshop Notes on Evolutionary Design, July 1998

See also
 Artificial life
 Evolutionary Computation
 Norman Packard
 Thomas S. Ray
 David E. Goldberg
 John Koza

References

External links
 Peter Bentley's home page at UCL
 Peter Bentley's book page
 Peter Bentley's book blog
 iStethoscope Pro webpages
 BBC Radio 4 documentary Natural Technology broadcast May 2001 featuring Peter Bentley
 Interview with Peter Bentley
 Curtis Brown author details for Peter Bentley

1972 births
Artificial intelligence researchers
British computer scientists
English computer scientists
Academics of University College London
Living people
Science communicators